|}

The July Cup is a Group 1 flat horse race in Great Britain open to horses aged three years or older. It is run on the July Course at Newmarket over a distance of 6 furlongs (1,207 metres), and it is scheduled to take place each year in July.

It is one of Britain's most valuable and prestigious sprint races, and many of its winners have been acknowledged as the champion sprinter in Europe.

History
The event was established in 1876, and the first two runnings were won by Springfield, a colt bred by Queen Victoria at the Hampton Court Stud.

The present system of race grading was introduced in 1971, and the July Cup was initially classed at Group 2 level. It was promoted to Group 1 status in 1978.

The July Cup was part of the Global Sprint Challenge from 2008 to 2017. It was the sixth leg of the series, preceded by the Diamond Jubilee Stakes and followed by the Sprinters Stakes.

The race is currently held on the final day of Newmarket's three-day July Festival meeting.

Records
Most successful horse (3 wins):
 Sundridge – 1902, 1903, 1904

Leading jockey (10 wins):
 Lester Piggott – Vigo (1957), Right Boy (1958, 1959), Tin Whistle (1960), Thatch (1973), Saritamer (1974), Solinus (1978), Thatching (1979), Moorestyle (1980), Mr Brooks (1992)

Leading trainer (5 wins):
 Charles Morton – Sundridge (1903, 1904), Spanish Prince (1912, 1913), Golden Sun (1914)
 Aidan O'Brien – Stravinsky (1999), Mozart (2001), Starspangledbanner (2010), U S Navy Flag (2018), Ten Sovereigns (2019)
 Vincent O'Brien – Thatch (1973), Saritamer (1974), Solinus (1978), Thatching (1979), Royal Academy (1990)

Leading owner (5 wins):
 Jack Joel – Sundridge (1903, 1904), Spanish Prince (1912, 1913), Golden Sun (1914)

Winners since 1918

Earlier winners

 1876: Springfield
 1877: Springfield
 1878: Trappist
 1879: Phenix
 1880: Charibert
 1881: Charibert
 1882: Tristan
 1883: Clairvaux
 1884: Geheimniss
 1885: Energy
 1886: Melton
 1887: Ormonde
 1888: Fullerton
 1889: Mephisto
 1890: Queen of the Fairies
 1891: Memoir
 1892: Workington
 1893: Prince Hampton
 1894: Best Man
 1895: Woolsthorpe
 1896: Worcester
 1897: Kilcock
 1898: Ugly
 1899: Eager
 1900: Running Stream
 1901: Lord Bobs
 1902: Sundridge
 1903: Sundridge
 1904: Sundridge
 1905: Delaunay
 1906: Thrush
 1907: Dinneford
 1908: Lesbia
 1909: Jack Snipe
 1910: Amore
 1911: Sunder
 1912: Spanish Prince
 1913: Spanish Prince
 1914: Golden Sun
 1915: Volta
 1916: Torloisk
 1917: no race

See also
 Horse racing in Great Britain
 List of British flat horse races

References
 Paris-Turf:
 Racing Post:
 galopp-sieger.de – July Cup.
 ifhaonline.org – International Federation of Horseracing Authorities – July Cup (2019).
 pedigreequery.com – July Cup – Newmarket.
 
 Race Recordings 

Flat races in Great Britain
Newmarket Racecourse
Open sprint category horse races
Recurring sporting events established in 1876
British Champions Series
1876 establishments in England